Gloucestershire County Council is a county council which administers the most strategic local government services in the non-metropolitan county of Gloucestershire, in the South West of England.

The council's principal functions are county roads and rights of way, social services, education and libraries, but it also provides many other local government services in the area it covers. This does not include South Gloucestershire, which is a unitary authority with all the functions of a county and a non-metropolitan district.

Gloucestershire County Council's land area is 2,653.03 km2.

Political control
Since the foundation of the council in 1973 political control of the council has been held by the following parties:

Cabinet
Council Leader Mark Hawthorne appointed the following Cabinet as of May 2019.

Notable members
Thomas Davies, later member of parliament for Cirencester and Tewkesbury
David Drew (born 1952), later member of parliament for Stroud
Sir Henry Elwes (born 1935), later Lord Lieutenant of Gloucestershire
Julie Girling (born 1956), later a Member of the European Parliament for South West England
Margaret Hills (born 1882) first female councillor on Stroud Urban District Council and a suffragist.
Nigel Jones (born 1948), later member of parliament for Cheltenham and a life peer

Elections and changes

2013 Gloucestershire County Council elections

The Conservative Party lost 13 notional seats, although the numerical loss was larger due to the reduction in the total number of councillors. The Liberal Democrats remained the second largest party by total seats and percentage vote, while the Labour Party had the largest net gain of five seats. UKIP won representation on the county council for the first time, winning three seats.

The number of Independent councillors rose to two, while both the Green Party and People Against Bureaucracy saw their only councillors re-elected.

By-elections and defections: 2013 to 2017

In July 2016, UKIP group leader Alan Preest defected to the Conservatives, claiming that the party lacked a purpose following the EU Referendum. He was followed shortly thereafter by UKIP councillor Colin Guyton, who left UKIP to serve as an independent. He later resigned from the County Council entirely, but a by-election was not held in his division due to the short length of time between then and the 2017 local elections.

Two by-elections were held to Gloucestershire County Council in the 2013–2017 term of office:

2017 Gloucestershire County Council elections

The Conservative Party gained 8 seats and retained control of the council. The Liberal Democrats held their 14 seats while Labour lost 4 seats and UKIP lost all 3 of their seats. The Green Party gained one seat. Minor parties lost both of their seats and People Against Bureaucracy held their seat.

By-elections and defections: 2017 to 2021

One by-election was held in this period. Another by-election was due to be held for the ward of Winchcombe and Woodmancote but was suspended due to the uncertainty around the ongoing COVID-19 pandemic in the United Kingdom.

2021 Gloucestershire County Council elections

On 6 May 2021 the Conservatives retained control, though with a reduced majority.

See also
:Category:Councillors in Gloucestershire

Notes

External links
 

County councils of England
1889 establishments in England
Local education authorities in England
Local authorities in Gloucestershire
Major precepting authorities in England
Leader and cabinet executives